A hoeroa is a type of traditional hand weapon of the Māori, the indigenous people of New Zealand. It is traditionally a whalebone long club (slightly curved baton / long spear). The tool was four to five feet in length and was used as a striking weapon, stabbing spear, and missile weapon.

References

External links
 Hoeroa in the collection of the Museum of New Zealand Te Papa Tongarewa

Ceremonial weapons
Māori weapons
New Zealand martial arts
Polearms